Genidens machadoi is a species of catfish in the family Ariidae. It was described by Alípio de Miranda-Ribeiro in 1918, originally under the genus Tachysurus. It inhabits rivers along the south Atlantic coast in Argentina,Uruguay and Brazil.

References

Ariidae
Fish described in 1918